The 2019 Des Moines mayoral election had an initial round held on November 5, 2019, with a runoff scheduled for December 3 to elect the mayor of Des Moines, Iowa. It saw the reelection of incumbent mayor Frank Cownie.

Cownie's margin of victory in the runoff was narrower than the margin of victory in any of his previous mayoral elections.

Candidates 
Frank Cownie, incumbent mayor of Des Moines since 2004
Jack Hatch, Iowa state senator
Chase E. Holm, U.S Army veteran
Joe Grandanette, Independent candidate for Iowa's 3rd Congressional District in 2016 and 2018, Republican candidate for Iowa's 3rd Congressional District in 2014 and 2016

Results

First round

Runoff

References 

Des Moines
Mayoral elections in Des Moines, Iowa
Des Moines